Van Wie or Vanwie or variation, may refer to:

 Van Wie Creek, a tributary of the Mohawk River in New York State, US

People
 David Van Wie (born 1964) U.S. inventor
 Derrick Vanwie, a member of the hardcore band One King Down
 Joel VanWie, a member of the pop-punk band The Last Sleepless City
 Virginia Van Wie (1909-1997) U.S. golfer

See also

 Wie (disambiguation)
 Van (disambiguation)
 Van Wieren, a surname